The 1984–85 La Liga season, the 54th since its establishment, started on September 1, 1984, and finished on April 21, 1985. The champions were Barcelona, who won the title by a 10-point margin over second-placed Atlético Madrid in their first season under the management of English coach Terry Venables.

Teams and locations

League table

Results table

Pichichi Trophy 

La Liga seasons
1984–85 in Spanish football leagues
Spain